Matthew Ramshaw (born 29 December 1999) is a field hockey player from England, who plays as a forward.

Personal life
Matthew Ramshaw was born and raised in Airedale.

Career

National teams
Ramshaw has represented both England and Great Britain at international levels.

Under–21
Ramshaw made his debut for the Great Britain U–21 team in 2018 at the Sultan of Johor Cup in Johor Bahru.

In 2019, he represented the team again at an eight–nations tournament in Madrid. He followed this up with his second Sultan of Johor Cup gold medal. Ramshaw also represented England in his junior career, winning a silver medal at the 2019 EuroHockey Junior Championship in Valencia.

England
Ramshaw made his senior international debut in 2022 during season three of the FIH Pro League. He scored twice in his debut match against France.

References

External links

1999 births
Living people
Male field hockey forwards
English male field hockey players